The Military Security Agency (abbr. ВБА / VBA) is a Serbian military security and counterintelligence agency under the Ministry of Defence.

The Military Security Agency directive is to provide security to the defense system (planning, organizing and realization of tasks and activities which pertain to the counterintelligence and security function).

Agency missions and objectives
The Military Security Agency is tasked with detecting, following, stopping, suppressing and intercepting threats. These tasks are:

 Intelligence and other activities of foreign services, organizations and persons which are directed against the Ministry of Defense and the Armed Forces of Serbia,
 Internal and international terrorism and subversive activities directed against commands, units and institutions of MOD and SAF.
 Detects-investigates-documents
 Criminal acts directed against the Constitution and the security of the Republic of Serbia, against humanity and international law, as well as the capital offenses with elements of organized crime when the perpetrators of these crimes are military professionals or civilians employed in MoD and SAF or when the aforesaid acts of crime are directed against MoD and SAF.

Within its jurisdiction, the Military Security Agency carries out those tasks laid out in the Article 7 of the Security Agencies Act. Pursuant to the Act, the members of the Agency have the competence to:

 Gather data (implementing special methods and means to collect data in secret-article 22-32)
 To register data
 Use weapons and other means of force (article 36)
 Implement police-given authorization in line with the Criminal Offence Act (article 8, section 3).

History

1946–1992
On 31 January 1946, after passing the Constitution of the Federative Republic of Yugoslavia, the Department of State Security was established. On 13 March 1946, the 3rd section of the Department of State Security was cancelled and was transformed into the military security service under the name Counterintelligence service. On 1 March 1948, the Counterintelligence Department Management becomes part of the Yugoslav Army GS and becomes XII department.

On 23 March 1955 the Counterintelligence service was renamed into the Security Organs. From GS, security organs were relocated to the State Secretariat for National Defense (later known as Federal Secretariat for National Security). Security organs were detached in commands, units and other army institutions.

1992–2002
On 20 May 1992 when the Army of FR Yugoslavia was established, Security Organs were attached to the Yugoslav Army GS.

2002–present
Based on the Act on the Federal Republic of Yugoslavia Security Services, passed on 3 July 2002, Security Organs were renamed into the Military Security Agency. This Agency was then relocated and attached to the Ministry of Defence, thus becoming its organizational unit. The reform of the military security agencies started by adopting the Act on Security Services (3 July 2002) and by forming the Military Security Agency (1 January 2004). The most significant changes are listed below:

 Military security services are subordinate directly to the Minister of Defense and not the Chief of General Staff,
 Special methods in the work of the Military Security Agency are permitted only by the Court’s decision,
 Mechanisms of democratic civil control have been introduced,
 Counterintelligence and MP functions have been developed.

After the dissolution of Security Administration, military counterintelligence agency of FR Yugoslavia, two separate agencies were established based on the decision on organizational and mobilization change. These two are: Military Intelligence Agency (VOA) and Military Security Agency (VBA). Military Security Agency was officially established on 1 September 2003.

By the order of the Minister of Defense on 29 September 2003, the Military security Agency was formed as organizational unit within the Ministry of Defence. On 23 December 2004, the Military Security Agency was presented to the public as an independent organizational unit of the Ministry of Defence. The Military Security Agency has started operating as of 1 January 2004.

See also
 Military Intelligence Agency (VOA)
 Security Intelligence Agency (BIA)
 Intelligence and Reconnaissance Directorate

References

External links
 Official website

2003 establishments in Serbia
Government agencies established in 2003
Counterintelligence agencies
Military intelligence agencies
Serbian intelligence agencies
Ministry of Defence (Serbia)